Tiny Dynamine is an EP by Scottish alternative rock band Cocteau Twins, released on 4AD Records.  The EP featured four non-album tracks. It was issued on 15 November 1985, two weeks prior to another EP, Echoes in a Shallow Bay. The two EP sets, which featured complementary artwork, were also released as a combined double EP in a gatefold cover and as an eight-track CD. The EP was later included in its entirety on the 1991 compilation The Box Set and the 2005 singles/EP collection Lullabies to Violaine.

Release details
The band did not originally intend to release these songs to the general public, presumably explaining the decision to release the material on EPs, rather than as what would have been their fourth album. The tracks on Tiny Dynamine and Echoes in a Shallow Bay were initially recorded to test the production capacities of a new studio. When the band decided the material was strong enough for release, they completed the recording process and issued the finished product on two EPs.

"Pink Orange Red" and "Plain Tiger" were performed live. An acoustic version of "Pink Orange Red" appeared on the 1995 EP Twinlights, and a remastered version appeared on the 2000 compilation Stars and Topsoil.

Many of the titles on the two EPs seem to have some link with Lepidoptera (butterflies and moths). Most are obscure, but the dynamine is a genus of nymphalid butterflies found in South America, the plain tiger is a common Asian butterfly and the lyrics to "Melonella" (on Echoes In A Shallow Bay) are simply a recounting of various Lepidopteric family names such as Hesperiidae and Papilionidae.

Track listing
All songs written by Cocteau Twins.

12": 4AD / BAD 510 (UK) 
 "Pink Orange Red" – 4:41
 "Ribbed and Veined" – 4:00
 "Plain Tiger" – 4:01
 "Sultitan Itan" – 3:53

CD: 4AD / BAD 510 CD (UK) 
 "Pink Orange Red" – 4:41
 "Ribbed and Veined" – 4:00
 "Plain Tiger" – 4:01
 "Sultitan Itan" – 3:53
 "Great Spangled Fritillary" – 4:02
 "Melonella" – 4:05
 "Pale Clouded White" – 4:59
 "Eggs and Their Shells" – 3:06

 Tracks 5–8 from Echoes in a Shallow Bay EP

Personnel
Elizabeth Fraser – vocals
Robin Guthrie – guitar
Simon Raymonde – bass guitar

Charts

Release notes

References 

Cocteau Twins albums
1985 EPs
UK Independent Singles Chart number-one singles